Ameitta Thiri Maha Dhamma Dewi of Ava (born Saw Hla Min) was the chief queen consort of King Thihathura I of Ava from 1468 to 1480. The queen was a granddaughter of King Mohnyin Thado. King Alaungpaya, the founder of Konbaung Dynasty, was a ninth generation descendant of the queen through her daughter Bodaw Shin Medaw. She was still alive in 1485; she accompanied her son Minkhaung II to inspect the pagodas damaged by an earthquake.

Ancestry

Family
She and Thihathura had six issue.

References

Bibliography
 
 
 

Chief queens consort of Ava
15th-century Burmese women